Mumtaz Ahmed (born 7 January 1970) is a Pakistani former swimmer, who specialised in sprint freestyle events. Ahmed qualified for the men's 100 m freestyle, as a 34-year-old, at the 2004 Summer Olympics in Athens. He received a Universality place from FINA in an entry time of 57.48. He challenged six other swimmers in heat one, including 15-year-old Leonel Matonse of Mozambique. He overhauled a one-minute barrier, and saved a sixth spot over Burundi's Emery Nziyunvira by more than 10 seconds in 59.19. Ahmed failed to advance into the semifinals, as he placed sixty-eighth overall out of 71 swimmers in the preliminaries.

References

External links

1970 births
Living people
Pakistani male freestyle swimmers
Olympic swimmers of Pakistan
Swimmers at the 2004 Summer Olympics
Place of birth missing (living people)
Swimmers at the 1998 Asian Games
Asian Games competitors for Pakistan
South Asian Games silver medalists for Pakistan
South Asian Games medalists in swimming